The siege of Kerak of 1183 was an attack on the castle of Kerak by the forces of Saladin in the Crusader stronghold.

Prelude 
Kerak was the stronghold of Raynald of Châtillon, Lord of Oultrejordain, 124 km south of Amman. The fortress was built in 1142 by Pagan the Butler, Lord of Montreal. While Raynald ruled, several truces existed between the Christian and Muslim states in the Holy Land, none of which he made any qualms about breaking. Raynald raided caravans that were trading near the Kerak castle for years. Raynald’s most daring raid was an 1182 naval expedition down the Red Sea to Mecca and El Medina. He continuously plundered the Red Sea coast and threatened the routes of pilgrims to Mecca in spring 1183. He captured the town of Aqaba, giving him a base of operations against Islam's holiest city, Mecca. Saladin, a Sunni Muslim and the leader of the Muslim forces, decided that the Kerak castle would be an ideal target for a Muslim attack, especially due to it being a block on the route from Egypt to Damascus.

Siege and relief
The Muslims had sought to take Kerak for several years, but now they stretched its defenses to the breaking point. There had long been plans of Baldwin’s half-sister Isabella to marry Reynald’s stepson in the fall of 1183. When Saladin learned of this, he prepared a siege with his large army and eight siege catapults.

Inside the walls, a royal marriage was taking place. Humphrey IV of Toron, Raynald's stepson and heir, was to take the hand of Isabella of Jerusalem, the King's half sister. At first, food was brought out to Saladin, so he told the soldiers to not fire at the tower where the wedding was taking place. This could have been due to courtesy, or because he did not want to harm the potentially two most expensive hostages. According to the historian Ernoul, “Etiennette, mother of the young bridegroom, sent out to Saladin a present of bread and meat and wine, with a message that gave him greeting and reminded him that he once in his youth had been a prisoner in Kerak, and had, as a slave, carried her when a child in his arms." Saladin was touched by the message and ordered his army to not attack that specific tower. Messengers managed to escape the town and take word to the King, Baldwin IV who was in Jerusalem at the time. In the following days, the Muslim forces aggressively went after Kerak's walls. They continuously sent stones and missiles through, damaging buildings on the inside.

Baldwin immediately marched with a relief force, accompanied by his regent, Raymond III of Tripoli. A beacon was promptly lit on David 's Tower in Jerusalem as a sign that help was coming to relieve the siege. Although suffering from leprosy since childhood, Baldwin's determination to frustrate Saladin's attempt was such that he led personally, although he had to be carried on a stretcher. In early December, Saladin got news that King Baldwin's army was on the way. Upon learning of this, he abandoned the siege and fled to Damascus.

Aftermath
In the following spring of 1184, Saladin advanced through Amman, and again attacked Kerak on August 13. A relieving army once again arrived to save Kerak after three weeks of Saladin's army attacking the walls with their engines. Kerak remained a Crusader stronghold and a symbol of the West's grip in the region until falling to Muslim control in 1188. The next time the Crusaders had to contend with a major siege, it was at the walls of Jerusalem itself.

In fiction
The motion picture Kingdom of Heaven, where Balian is played by Orlando Bloom and Ghassan Massoud plays Saladin, contains a fictional portrayal of the siege. In the film, knights under the command of Balian engaged the Ayyubids as they approached Kerak, so that defenseless citizens could retreat to Raynald's castle. The film also showed the siege not taking place, but King Baldwin IV and Saladin negotiating a settlement. Baldwin then punished Raynald for breaking the truce (with Saladin) by attacking a Muslim caravan.

There is also a "Siege of Kerak" soundtrack in the game Crusader Kings II.

Citations

Bibliography

 Smail, R. C. Crusading Warfare 1097–1193. New York: Barnes & Noble Books, (1956) 1995. 
 
 
 
 
 
 
 

Kerak 1184
Kerak 1184
Conflicts in 1183
Conflicts in 1184
1183 in Asia
1184 in Asia
Karak
Kerak
1180s in the Kingdom of Jerusalem